Giorgi V Gurieli, of the western Georgian House of Gurieli, was Prince of Guria from 1756 to 1758 and again from 1765 to 1771 and from 1776 to 1788.

Biography 
Giorgi was a son of Giorgi IV Gurieli and a younger brother of Mamia IV Gurieli. He was installed by King Solomon I of Imereti as Prince-regnant of Guria, in 1756, in place of Mamia, who had been involved in a revolt against Solomon four years earlier. Mamia was able to convince King Heraclius II of Kakheti and the Ottoman pasha of Akhaltsikhe to help him recover the throne and Giorgi was deposed in his favor. In 1765, Hasan Pasha of Akhaltsikhe, responding to Mamia's involvement in Solomon's anti-Ottoman endeavors, restored Giorgi in Guria. Giorgi then joined the Imeretian pretender Prince Teimuraz and duke of Racha in an Ottoman-sponsored revolt against Solomon, but they suffered defeat at Chkhari in 1768.

In 1770, Solomon took advantage of the ongoing Russo-Turkish War of 1767–1774, crossed into Guria, where he defeated an Ottoman force marching from Batumi to Imereti, and, in 1771, deposed Giorgi in Mamia's favor. It was not until 1776 that Giorgi, exploiting the increasingly deteriorating relations between Solomon and Mamia, staged a coup against his brother and once again seized power in Guria. He then reconciled with Solomon and joined his expedition against the Ottoman-controlled Lower Guria and Adjara, once belonging to the Gurieli in 1784. The campaign ended in disaster for the Georgian rulers in March 1784, resulting in Guria's permanent loss of the Kobuleti area to the Ottoman Empire. Later that year, following Solomon's death, Giorgi Gurieli supported David II's bid for the crown of Imereti and fought the Ottoman-supported pretender, Prince Kaikhosro Abashidze. Giorgi ruled Guria for more years until 1788, when he, already seasoned and weary of political instability in his principality, abdicated in favor of his eldest son, Simon II Gurieli.

Family 
Giorgi Gurieli was married to Princess Mariam (died ), probably daughter of Alexander V of Imereti. He had six children:

 Prince Simon II Gurieli (died 1792), Prince-regnant of Guria;
 Prince Vakhtang II Gurieli (died 1814 or 1825), Prince-regnant of Guria;
 Prince Kaikhosro IV Gurieli (died 1829), prince-regent (1792–1809);
 Prince Levan, married to Princess Elisabed Anchabadze;
 Princess Agata (fl. 1837), married to Prince Aleksandre Machutadze and then, Prince Davit Mikeladze;
 Prince Davit (died c. 1833), married to Princess Elene, daughter of Grigol Dadiani of Mingrelia. In the 1820s, he was an opponent of the Russian hegemony over Guria and died in exile in the Ottoman Empire. David's two sons—Grigol (1819–1892) and Levan (1824–1888) were generals in the Russian army. He was the ancestor of the extant line of the Gurieli dynasty.

References 

Year of birth unknown
Year of death unknown
House of Gurieli
18th-century people from Georgia (country)